Chinese Wall at  above sea level is a cliff and peak in the White Cloud Mountains of Idaho.

References 

Mountains of Custer County, Idaho
Mountains of Idaho
Sawtooth National Forest